Path of Eight is the fifth studio album by the atmospheric sludge metal band Mouth of the Architect. Recorded over a weekend at the bands’ rehearsal space in Dayton, OH, it was released on Translation Loss Records on 7 October 2016.

The album was released on digipack CD, limited edition 300 red and gray mix LP and 700 black LP.

Track listing

Personnel
Steve Brooks – vocals, guitar, producer
John Lakes – vocals, guitar, producer
Jason Watkins - vocals, keyboards
Dave Mann - drums
Evan Danielson – bass
Chris Common – mixing, mastering

References

Mouth of the Architect albums
2016 albums